This article presents the complete discography of Duane Allman as a member of the Hour Glass, the Allman Brothers Band, Derek and the Dominos and the Allman Joys, as a session musician and as a solo artist, sorted by year.

References

Rock music discographies
Blues discographies
Pop music discographies
Discographies of American artists